Juan Manuel Rodríguez Pérez (born 16 December 1958) is a Spanish football manager, currently in charge of Las Palmas B.

Managerial career
Rodríguez was born in Las Palmas, Canary Islands, and began his managerial career with CD Arguineguín after his footballing career was cut short due to injury. He rotated through clubs in his native regions for the following campaigns, and in 1995 was appointed manager of UD Las Palmas Atlético, being also an assistant at the main squad.

After suffering team relegation from Segunda División B with UD Realejos in 1997, Rodríguez spent three full campaigns at UD Lanzarote, being promoted from Tercera División in his second. He left the latter in 2000, and only returned to the bench two years later, taking over UD Vecindario and being champion of its group.

On 1 July 2003 Rodríguez returned to Las Palmas, now as manager of the first team in Segunda División. He was relieved from his duties in December, after only winning three matches out of 16.

In the 2004 summer Rodríguez was named at the helm of UD Villa de Santa Brígida, taking the club to the third level at the end of the 2006–07 campaign. On 28 October 2007 he went back to the UD for a third spell, being sacked on 3 December of the following year.

On 27 February 2011 Rodríguez was again appointed manager of Las Palmas, replacing fired Paco Jémez. After narrowly avoiding relegation he renewed his link, and after a final 9th position in the following season, he left the club.

Managerial statistics

References

External links

Soccerway profile

1958 births
Living people
Footballers from Las Palmas
Spanish football managers
Segunda División managers
UD Vecindario managers
UD Las Palmas managers
Association footballers not categorized by position
Association football players not categorized by nationality